The Eight Mountains is a 2022 Italian-language drama film directed by Felix van Groeningen and Charlotte Vandermeersch, who adapted the screenplay from the novel of the same name by Paolo Cognetti. The film depicts a friendship between two men who spend their childhood together in a remote Alpine village and reconnect later as adults. It premiered in competition at the Cannes Film Festival in May 2022, winning the Jury Prize.

Plot 
The movie starts when a city boy, Pietro, goes on holiday to the mountains with his parents. The village they stay at is dying out, only one child remains, another boy of similar age, Bruno, who has to work in the farm already. This is only the beginning of an epic tale that will follow the lives of these very different people. The title hints at the choices we make, and the movie reminded me of 'Into the wild' such as the way the main character also tries to adopt an alternative lifestyle . The story continuous after one goes on to study but without knowing which life to choose, and the other is pushed into construction work by his father. Years later they meet again after the father of Pietro died, and turns out to have left him a collapsed shelter in the high mountains near their old holiday retreat, and a hidden past. And then their lives and the movie blossom.

Cast
 Luca Marinelli as Pietro 
 Lupo Barbiero as young Pietro
 Andrea Palma as adolescent Pietro
 Alessandro Borghi as Bruno 
 Cristiano Sassella as young Bruno
 Francesco Palombelli as adolescent Bruno
 Filippo Timi as Giovanni
 Elena Lietti as Francesca 
 Elisabetta Mazzullo as Lara
 Surakshya Panta as Asmi

Production
The film was shot in the Italian Alps, Turin, and Nepal over seven months, beginning in the summer of 2021.

Reception
On review aggregator website Rotten Tomatoes, the film holds an approval rating of 74%, based on 26 reviews, and an average rating of 7.3/10. On Metacritic, it has a weighted average score of 77 out of 100 based on 9 critics, indicating "generally favorable reviews".

See also 
 List of Italian films of 2022

References

External links
 

2022 drama films
2022 films
Italian drama films
Belgian drama films
French drama films
2020s Italian-language films
Films set in Piedmont
Films set in Turin
Films set in the Alps
Films set in Nepal
Films set in the Himalayas
Films shot in Piedmont
Films shot in Turin
Films shot in Nepal
Films directed by Felix van Groeningen
2020s French films